Elizabeth Millicent Sutherland, 24th Countess of Sutherland (née Sutherland-Leveson-Gower; 30 March 1921 – 9 December 2019) was a Scottish noblewoman. She was the holder of an  earldom in the Peerage of Scotland, and was chief of Clan Sutherland.

Early life
Sutherland was born in Chelsea, London, on 30 March 1921, the only child of Elizabeth Demarest (1892–1931), a daughter of Warren Gardener Demarest of New York City, and Major Lord Alastair Sutherland-Leveson-Gower (1890–1921), a son of Cromartie Sutherland-Leveson-Gower, 4th Duke of Sutherland.

Her father died while taking part in a big game expedition in Rhodesia, contracting malaria and dying there on 28 April 1921, aged 31. In 1931, her mother married Baron George Osten Driesen; she died three months after their wedding. Sutherland became a ward of her uncle George Sutherland-Leveson-Gower, 5th Duke of Sutherland, and when he died without legitimate issue, she succeeded him as the 24th Countess of Sutherland and Lady Strathnaver. The dukedom and the other titles that could only pass in the male line were inherited by the Earl of Ellesmere. She also inherited most of her uncle's large land-holdings, including Dunrobin Castle. She subsequently dropped the double-barrels in her family name, in order to be recognised as chief of Clan Sutherland.

Marriage
On 5 January 1946, Sutherland married journalist Charles Noel Janson (25 December 1917–15 June 2006), and together, they had four children:
 Alistair Charles St. Clair Sutherland, 25th Earl of Sutherland (born 7 January 1947); he married Eileen Baker on 29 November 1968, and they were divorced in 1980. They have two daughters. He remarried Gillian Murray on 21 March 1980, and they have two children.
 The Hon. Martin Dearman Sutherland Janson (born 7 January 1947); he married The Hon. Mary Balfour (daughter of Harold Balfour, 1st Baron Balfour of Inchrye) on 14 February 1974. They have five sons.
 Lady Annabel Elizabeth Hélène Janson (born 16 May 1952) she married John Vernon Bainton, son of Richard Bainton, on 29 October 1982.
 The Hon. Matthew Peter Demarest Janson (8 April 1955 – 5 December 1969)

Later life

She died on 9 December 2019 at the London home she shared with her daughter Annabel. She was aged 98. Her funeral took place at Dornoch Cathedral on 21 December.

Arms

References

External links

Elizabeth Sutherland, 24th Countess of Sutherland

Hereditary women peers
Elizabeth
Scottish countesses
Elizabeth Sutherland, 24th Countess of Sutherland
1921 births
2019 deaths
20th-century Scottish people
20th-century Scottish women
21st-century Scottish people
21st-century Scottish women
20th-century Scottish businesspeople
Sutherland